Jose Romeo Bustillos Diaz (November 28, 1940 – May 10, 2005) was a Filipino actor.

He performed in films such as Ang Maestro (1981), The Impossible Kid (1982), Gising Na... Ang Higanteng Natutulog (1995) and Si Samson at Si Delilah (1983). Other notable roles were in films like Kalawang sa Bakal (1987), Don Pepe (1988), Pambato (1993), Tunay na Magkaibigan Peksman (1994) and Jacob C.I.S. (1997).

Biography
His father was a Mexican American of Spanish descent. Diaz was the younger brother of Paquito Diaz and uncle of Joko Diaz, who are both actors.

Prior to his acting career, Diaz played collegiate basketball for the FEU Tamaraws and briefly for the Crispa Redmanizers and the Ysmael Steel Admirals in the 1960s.

Diaz died on May 10, 2005 due to tongue cancer caused by heavy smoking, five months after the death of his longtime friend Fernando Poe Jr.

Filmography

Film

Television
Yagit (1983–1985) as Chito

References

External links

1941 births
2005 deaths
20th-century comedians
Basketball players from Pampanga
Crispa Redmanizers players
Deaths from cancer in the Philippines
Deaths from oral cancer
Romy
FEU Tamaraws basketball players
Filipino male comedians
Filipino male film actors
Filipino male television actors
Filipino men's basketball players
Filipino people of American descent
Kapampangan people
Filipino people of Mexican descent
Filipino people of Spanish descent
Filipino television personalities
Male actors from Pampanga